Mike Mokamba Nyang'au (born August 28, 1994) is a Kenyan sprinter.

Mokamba set a national record for Kenya in the 100 meters in winning the 2015 national championships.

In the 200 meters Mokamba obtained a qualifying time for the 2015 World Championships in Athletics.  He ultimately was named to the Kenyan team for that event.

Competition record

References

External links

1994 births
Living people
Kenyan male sprinters
World Athletics Championships athletes for Kenya
Athletes (track and field) at the 2018 Commonwealth Games
Athletes (track and field) at the 2019 African Games
Commonwealth Games competitors for Kenya
African Games competitors for Kenya
African Championships in Athletics winners
21st-century Kenyan people
Commonwealth Games bronze medallists for Kenya
Commonwealth Games medallists in athletics
Athletes (track and field) at the 2022 Commonwealth Games
Medallists at the 2022 Commonwealth Games